Carabus alysidotus is a species of ground beetle from family Carabidae found in France and Italy.

References

alysidotus
Beetles described in 1798